José Luis Alcaine (born 26 December 1938) is a Spanish cinematographer. Educated in Tangier, he was the first cinematographer to use a fluorescent tube as key lighting in the 1970s. He has worked on films such as Belle Époque (Academy Award for Best Foreign Language Film, 1993), Two Much (1995), Blast from the Past (1999), and The Skin I Live In (2011).

He won the European Film Award for Best Cinematographer for Volver, and has received five Goya Awards for best cinematography.

In February 2019, he received the Medalla de Oro al Mérito en las Bellas Artes.<ref>

References

External links

Fernández-Santos, Elsa. «Nuevas teorías sobre un icono del siglo XX Un enigma cinematográfico tras el Guernica de Picasso.» 9 de septiembre de 2011. El Paíshttp://www.rtve.es/alacarta/videos/dias-de-cine/dias-cine-jose-luis-alcaine-cree-picasso-se-inspiro-adios-armas-para-guernica/1268475/
https://www.youtube.com/watch?v=CG44wQoqP8U      Conference about the inspiration of El Bosco, Middle Age Paintings and  the Miracles and Mysteries Theater ( North Europe) or Street Theater ( England )

1938 births
Living people
European Film Award for Best Cinematographer winners
Spanish cinematographers